Sacco may refer to:

 Sacco (clothing) (also Sakko), a type of jacket
 Sacco (river), a river of central Italy
 Sacco, Campania, a comune (municipality) in southern Italy
 Sacco chair, by Piero Gatti, Cesare Paolini, Franco Teodoro
 Ospedale Luigi Sacco, a hospital in Milan, Italy
 Savings and Credit Cooperative Society or Credit Union

People with the surname
 Albert Sacco (born 1949), American astronaut
 Antonio Sacco (1708–1788), Italian actor
 Bruno Sacco (born 1933), Italian car designer
 David Sacco (born	(1971), American former ice hockey player
 Desmond Sacco, South African businessman
 Joe Sacco (born 1960), Maltese artist and journalist 
 Joe Sacco (ice hockey) (born 1969), American former ice hockey player
 José da Costa Sacco (born 1930), Brazilian botanist
 Luigi Sacco (1883–1970), Italian soldier and cryptologist
 Michael Sacco (born 1937), American labor leader
 Nicholas Sacco (born 1946), American politician from New Jersey
 Nicola Sacco (1891–1927), Italian-American anarchist; co-defendant in the Sacco and Vanzetti case
 Patrick Peter Sacco (1928–2000), American composer and singer
 Raffaele Sacco (1787–1872), Italian songwriter

See also
 Sacko, a Malian surname
 SACCO, Savings and Credit Co-Operative Societies, a term used in Africa
 Saco (disambiguation)

Italian-language surnames